The Lou Kaplan Trophy was presented annually to the World Hockey Association's (WHA) rookie of the year.

History
Lou Kaplan was one of the original owners of the Minnesota Fighting Saints of the WHA. On August 10, 1973, the WHA officially named its trophies after the team officials at the WHA's founding meeting in 1972. The rookie-of-the-year trophy was named after Kaplan.

Winners
1973 – Terry Caffery, New England Whalers
1974 – Mark Howe, Houston Aeros
1975 – Anders Hedberg, Winnipeg Jets
1976 – Mark Napier, Toronto Toros
1977 – George Lyle, New England Whalers
1978 – Kent Nilsson, Winnipeg Jets
1979 – Wayne Gretzky, Edmonton Oilers

References

World Hockey Association trophies and awards